The 1989 Furman Paladins football team represented Furman University as a member of the Southern Conference (SoCon) during the 1989 NCAA Division I-AA football season. In their fourth year under head coach Jimmy Satterfield, the Paladins compiled an overall record of 12–2 with a conference mark of 7–0, winning the SoCon title.

Schedule

References

Furman
Furman Paladins football seasons
Southern Conference football champion seasons
Furman Paladins football